Carl Olson (July 11, 1928 – January 16, 2002) was an American boxer. He was the World Middleweight champion between October 1953 and December 1955, the longest reign of any champion in that division during the 1950s.
His nickname, Bobo, was based on his younger sister's mispronunciation of "brother".

Early years

Olson was born in Honolulu, Territory of Hawaii to a Portuguese mother and a Swedish father, hence his other nickname "The Hawaiian Swede".  Like many boxers, Olson decided to take up the sport after getting into fights on the streets.  Olson received training from boxers who were stationed in Hawaii during World War II, and it was during this period that he picked up his two trademark tattoos.

Using a fake identity card Olson obtained a boxing license at the age of 16.  His earliest fights were in his native Kalihi, Hawaii. He had won his first three contests, two by knockout, before his true age was discovered.  During 1945, Olson ran off to San Francisco to continue his boxing career.  By the time he was 18, he had amassed a record of 13 successive wins (10 by KO).  Even at this stage his power and huge reserves of stamina were clear, as was his rather average skill.

Professional career

The first real test of Olson's career came on March 20, 1950, Olson's record at this point was 40 wins and 2 losses, against the Australian Dave Sands.  Olson lost to a close points decision in Sydney.  Seven months after this Olson had his first fight against Sugar Ray Robinson, for the lowly regarded Pennsylvania State World Middleweight Title.  Olson, who was widely seen as a slow starter, failed to get into the fight, even though Robinson was not having one of his best fights.  Olson managed to hold on for 11 rounds before being knocked out.  Despite his great record it was clear that Olson was still too inexperienced to be fighting at that level.

A year after his loss to Robinson, Olson managed to get a rematch against Dave Sands.  This fight was the first to be televised coast-to-coast in America. However, Sands once again proved too much for Olson, he again won by unanimous decision.

On March 13, 1952 Olson fought Robinson again, this time for the world middleweight title.  Robinson, who had lost and regained the title against Randy Turpin in his previous two fights, was looking for an easy fight.  However, Olson had improved significantly from their first encounter.  Through ten rounds the fight was neck-and-neck, and only a dominant finish by Robinson over the last five rounds won him the decision.  The Los Angeles Times wrote that Robinson won the first six rounds easily, slowly stacking up points, but that Olson reduced the points margin in the seventh through tenth.  Robinson won the fifteenth convincingly with hard rights and lefts. This would be the only time that Olson lasted the duration against Robinson.

Robinson retired for the first time in December 1952, vacating his middleweight crown.  The top four contenders fought a tournament for the title.  Olson defeated Paddy Young for the American title to gain the right to fight for the vacant world title, Turpin won the other eliminator against Charley Humez.

The title fight against Turpin took place on October 21, 1953, at Madison Square Garden. Turpin dominated the first four rounds, he almost scored a knockdown in the first round, before Olson got a grip on the fight.  As the fight progressed Olson took the initiative, he scored knockdowns in the 10th and 11th rounds on the way to a unanimous decision.  Following his success Olson was voted Ring magazine's fighter of the year for 1953.

Olson won all seven of his fights in 1954 including defenses of his title against such big names as Kid Gavilan, Rocky Castellani, and Pierre Langlois.

In 1955 Olson, who was finding it increasingly difficult to make weight, stepped up to light heavyweight.  His first major fight in this category was against former champion Joey Maxim. Olson won the fight easily on points after scoring knockdowns in both the 2nd and 9th rounds.  On June 22 Olson challenged 41-year-old Archie Moore for the light heavyweight title, a fight that many believed Olson would easily win.  However, Moore was too strong for Olson and won by knockout after only a minute had elapsed of the third round.  After this fight Olson began his decline.

Following two walkover wins, Olson put his middleweight title on the line against Robinson, who was once again number 1 contender following his brief retirement, on December 9, 1955.  It was Olson's fourth and final defense of his title, but ended as a stunning comeback for Robinson.  Olson, who entered the fight as a 3–1 favorite, was knocked out in the second round. The rematch, fought five months later at Wrigley Field, on May 18, 1956, ended similarly with Olson going down in the fourth. Robinson ended the bout with a hard left hook to the body and a right to the jaw.  Olson had made the mistake of dropping his right hand after Robinson's hard left, dropping his only defense in an instant. After this second defeat Olson announced his retirement.

Late career

After a year out of the game Olson returned as a heavyweight to fight Maxim again, a fight he won on points.  Olson took another year out following a knockout defeat against Pat McMurtry.  Whilst initially coming back as a journeyman, despite being only 30, Olson managed to reestablish himself as a contender.  On November 27, 1964, he fought José Torres with the winner going on to fight the champion, Willie Pastrano.  Olson was knocked out after 2 minutes of the first round.  This defeat effectively ended his career, he would only fight again four more times, with his final fight being a defeat to Gene Fullmer's younger brother, Don.

Life after boxing

Olson retired with a record of 97 wins (47 by KO), 16 losses, and 2 draws from his 115 professional fights.  He went on to work with disaffected youngsters before working as a PR officer for the Elevator Operating Engineers Local Union in San Francisco.  In 1987 he was a Union Elevator Operator in Lancaster, California, working on new construction at the Antelope Valley Medical Center.

In the 1990s he lived in Northern California for a time.  In his later years Olson suffered from Alzheimer's disease. To add quality of life to his later years he and much of his close family returned to Honolulu.  He died on January 16, 2002, in Honolulu at Queens Medical Center at the age of 73.  

He was inducted into the World Boxing Hall of Fame in 1958, and the International Boxing Hall of Fame in 2000.

Professional boxing record

See also
List of middleweight boxing champions

References

External links

https://titlehistories.com/boxing/na/usa/ny/nysac-m.html
https://titlehistories.com/boxing/wba/wba-world-m.html

1928 births
2002 deaths
Middleweight boxers
Boxers from Hawaii
American people of Swedish descent
American people of Portuguese descent
Deaths from dementia in Hawaii
Deaths from Alzheimer's disease
American male boxers
International Boxing Hall of Fame inductees